For other places with the same name, see Surveyor Bay (disambiguation)

Surveyors Bay is a rural locality and a bay in the local government area (LGA) of Huon Valley in the South-east LGA region of Tasmania. The 2016 census has a population of 47 for the state suburb of Surveyors Bay.

History 
The area was formerly known as Camden, but by 1899 was renamed. Surveyors Bay was gazetted as a locality in 1971.

Geography
The waters of the Huon River estuary form the north-east to south-east boundaries.

Road infrastructure 
Route C638 (Esperance Coast Road) enters from the north-east and runs through to the south-east, where it exits.

References

Towns in Tasmania
Bays of Tasmania
Localities of Huon Valley Council